Maqaasid (born 2008) was a Thoroughbred racehorse. Ridden by Richard Hills, she won the prestigious Queen Mary Stakes at Royal Ascot in 2010, in a new track record of 59.17. In her racing career, she had two wins from ten starts.

References

2008 racehorse births
Racehorses bred in the United Kingdom
Racehorses trained in the United Kingdom
Thoroughbred family 2-f